John Patrick Lowrie (born June 28, 1952) is an American actor, musician and author best known for voicing the Sniper in Team Fortress 2 and various characters in Dota 2. He has played Sherlock Holmes in the radio series The Further Adventures of Sherlock Holmes since 2001.

Career 
Lowrie has performed roles in video games such as The Suffering and The Suffering: Ties That Bind, Total Annihilation and its expansions, The Operative: No One Lives Forever and No One Lives Forever 2: A Spy in H.A.R.M.'s Way. Lowrie is mostly recognized for his voice acting in Valve games such as Team Fortress 2, Half-Life 2, Half-Life 2: Episode One, Half-Life 2: Episode Two,  Left 4 Dead, Dota 2, and Artifact.

He is noted for playing the roles of the Sniper in the online first-person shooter game Team Fortress 2, Agent Gray in the MMORPG The Matrix Online, as well as Odessa Cubbage and the male citizens in Half-Life 2.

Lowrie has played Sherlock Holmes in the radio drama series The Further Adventures of Sherlock Holmes on the program Imagination Theatre since 2001. He also voiced Holmes in the program's related radio series The Classic Adventures of Sherlock Holmes. He and Lawrence Albert, who voices Dr. Watson on the program, are the longest-running audio Holmes and Watson team in American radio history.

He wrote a science fiction novel published in 2011 titled Dancing with Eternity.

Personal life 
His adolescence was spent in Boulder, Colorado, where he attended various high schools briefly before joining the United States Navy. He studied for a Ph.D. in Music Composition at Indiana University. He has been married to Ellen McLain since 1986. McLain also works as a voice actor, and has starred alongside him in Half-Life 2, Team Fortress 2, and Dota 2.

Works

Video games

Animation

References

External links 
 Official website
 

1952 births
Living people
American flautists
American male voice actors
American male video game actors
American rock guitarists
American rock singers
20th-century American guitarists
20th-century American male actors
20th-century American singers
21st-century American guitarists
21st-century American male actors
21st-century American singers
20th-century flautists
21st-century flautists